This is a list of the complete squads for the 2015 Six Nations Championship, an annual rugby union tournament contested by the national rugby teams of England, France, Ireland, Italy, Scotland and Wales. Ireland are the defending champions.

Note: Number of caps and players' ages are indicated as of 6 February 2015 – the tournament's opening day.

England
On 21 January, England announced a 34-man squad for the 2015 Six Nations Championship, including 2 uncapped players.

Head coach:  Stuart Lancaster

Call-ups
On 26 January, Tom Croft and Christian Day were added to the squad to cover the injured Tom Wood and Geoff Parling.

On 27 January, Owen Farrell was ruled out the whole Championship.

On 29 January, Kieran Brookes was added to the squad as injury cover for David Wilson.

On 31 January, Henry Slade was added to the squad as injury cover for Kyle Eastmond, while Henry Thomas has also been added to the squad as injury cover in the front row. Sam Burgess was also invited by head coach Stuart Lancaster to train with the senior squad, to continue his learning process in union.

On 12 February, David Wilson was ruled out of the whole Championship.

On 24 February, Chris Pennell was added to the squad as a precautionary injury cover for Mike Brown ahead of the Round 3 clash against Ireland.

On 9 March, Sam Burgess, Courtney Lawes and Rob Webber were added to the squad ahead of the Scotland clash in round 4.

France
On 15 January, France named a 31-man squad for the 2015 Six Nations Championship. Additional players maybe added to the squad throughout the tournament due to the selection formart the FFR uses during the Six Nations and End-of-year tests.

Head coach:  Philippe Saint-André

Call-ups
On 19 January, Saint-André added Wenceslas Lauret to the squad to replace the injured Charles Ollivon.

On 21 January, Loann Goujon is brought in to the squad to cover for Louis Picamoles.

On 25 January, Morgan Parra was brought in to the squad to cover the injured Brice Dulin.

On 1 February, Gaël Fickou was added to the squad as injury cover for the injured Alexandre Dumoulin.

On 8 February, Vincent Debaty and Jocelino Suta were added to the squad for the Ireland game, as injury cover for Alexandre Menini and Alexandre Flanquart respectively.

On 19 February, Pierre Bernard was added to the squad.

On 21 February, Jules Plisson was added to the squad to replace the newly added Pierre Bernard, who was ruled out due to injury.

On 5 March, Maxime Mermoz was called up to the squad in replacement for Wesley Fofana for the final two rounds of the tournament.

On 10 March, Marc Andreu was called up to the squad to replace Sofiane Guitoune who was ruled out of Round 4 due to injury.

On 17 March, Thomas Domingo was called up to the squad to replace Eddy Ben Arous who was ruled out of the final week due to injury.

Ireland
On 1 February, following the Ireland Wolfhounds match, Ireland reduced the extended 46-man squad down to a 38-man squad for the 2015 Six Nations Championship.

Head coach:  Joe Schmidt

Call-ups
On 24 February, Billy Holland and Roger Wilson were added to the squad as injury cover for Jamie Heaslip.

On 9 March, Michael Bent, Tadhg Furlong and Dan Tuohy were added to the squad for the final two matches against Wales and Scotland.

Italy
On 15 January, Italy named a 31-man squad for the 2015 Six Nations Championship, featuring 4 uncapped players.

Head coach:  Jacques Brunel

Call-ups
On 25 January, Marco Barbini was added to the squad to further selection options in the back row.

On 29 January, Marco Fuser was added to the squad as cover for the injured Quintin Geldenhuys.

On 8 February, Tommaso Boni and Samuela Vunisa were added to the squad as injury cover for Michele Campagnaro and Alessandro Zanni.

On 22 February, Lorenzo Cittadini, was added as injury cover for Martin Castrogiovanni, while Enrico Bacchin and Antonio Pavanello were added to the squad after strong performances for Treviso in the first week off.

On 12 March, Luciano Orquera was added to the squad as injury cover for Kelly Haimona.

On 16 March, Michele Rizzo was added to the squad to replace Matías Agüero who was ruled out of the final match due to injury.

Scotland
On 20 January, Scotland announced a 32-man squad for the 2015 Six Nations Championship, including four uncapped players, one of whom is the Scottish-qualified Australian-born Ben Toolis.

Head coach:  Vern Cotter

Call-ups
On 26 January, Johnnie Beattie was added to the squad as injury cover for Dave Denton.

On 1 February, Ryan Grant was recalled to the squad following his disciplinary hearings.

On 17 February, Tim Swinson was called up to the squad to replace Richie Gray who was ruled out of the tournament after an injury sustained in round 2.

On 23 February, Alex Allan, Adam Ashe, Chris Cusiter and Moray Low were added to the squad, with Allan and Low replacing Gordon Reid and Jon Welsh due to injury.

On 9 March, Stuart McInally was added to the squad as precautionary injury cover for Ross Ford.

Wales
On 20 January, Wales named a 34-man squad for the 2015 Six Nations Championship, including four uncapped players, one of whom was the Welsh-qualified New Zealand-born Gareth Anscombe.

Head coach:  Warren Gatland

Call-ups
On 9 March, Ken Owens was added to the squad after recovering from a neck injury in 2014, while prop Tomas Francis (Exeter Chiefs) was invited to train with the squad following injury to Paul James.

On 16 March, Tomas Francis was promoted to the main team for the final week of the tournament, following injury to Samson Lee. While Rhys Gill was invited to train with the squad following injury to Gethin Jenkins.

References

2015
2015 Six Nations Championship